St. Mark's Cathedral is an Episcopal cathedral in Shreveport, Louisiana, United States. It is the seat of the Diocese of Western Louisiana.  The first services of the Episcopal church in Shreveport were celebrated by the Rt. Rev. Leonidas Polk, the Bishop of Louisiana in March 1839.  That liturgy is considered the founding day of St. Mark's Church.  The parish church was located on the corner of Cotton Street and Texas Avenue since 1905.  It is now the Church of the Holy Cross.  Prior to that building, the church was located on Fannin Street.  The present church at Fairfield Avenue and Rutherford Street was completed in 1954.  It became the diocesan cathedral on July 7, 1990.

School 
A committee of parishioners of St. Mark's Church founded St. Mark's Day School in September 1953, as an early childhood program. The school was moved to its current location on Fairfield Avenue when it was opened in January 1954. Over the years, it has evolved into St. Mark's Cathedral School, with a program extending from three-year-olds through eighth grade. Throughout its history it has enjoyed the strong support of the Cathedral congregation, especially in the construction of the handsome facilities available for the school and its commitment to Episcopal education.

See also
List of the Episcopal cathedrals of the United States
List of cathedrals in the United States

References

Religious organizations established in 1839
Churches completed in 1954
20th-century Episcopal church buildings
Gothic Revival church buildings in Louisiana
Episcopal church buildings in Louisiana
Mark, Shreveport
Churches in Shreveport, Louisiana
1839 establishments in Louisiana